Beatriz Souza (born 20 May 1998) is a Brazilian judoka.

She won a medal at the 2019 World Judo Championships.

She won the silver medal in her event at the 2022 Judo Grand Slam Tel Aviv held in Tel Aviv, Israel.

Achievements

References

External links

 
 
 

1998 births
Living people
Brazilian female judoka
Judoka at the 2019 Pan American Games
Pan American Games medalists in judo
Pan American Games bronze medalists for Brazil
Medalists at the 2019 Pan American Games
21st-century Brazilian women